Andrew Squire is an English male lawn bowler.

Bowls career
Squire became the English champion when he won the singles tournament during the 2007 National Championships. He also finished runner-up to Louis Ridout in 2018.

Squire bowls for Maldon Bowling Club  and in 2018 broke a men's 90 year old county record when winning the premier singles competition for the sixth time. He also won all three singles championships, the four wood, the two wood and the Champion of Champions for a second time.

References

Living people
English male bowls players
Year of birth missing (living people)